Charles Hay may refer to:
Charles Hay, 13th Earl of Erroll (1677–1717), Scottish peer
Lord Charles Hay (c. 1700–1760), British Army general and politician
Charles Craufurd Hay (1809–1873), British Army officer
Charles Hay (politician) (1843–1924), Scottish-born politician in Manitoba, Canada
Charles Hay, 20th Earl of Erroll (1852–1927), Scottish soldier and Conservative politician
Charles Hay (ice hockey) (1902–1973), Canadian ice hockey player, organizer, and administrator
Charles Hay, 16th Earl of Kinnoull (born 1962), Scottish earl
Charles Hay (diplomat), British diplomat

See also
Charles Hayes (disambiguation)